Apatosaurinae is a subfamily of diplodocid sauropods that existed between 157 and 150 million years ago in North America. The group includes two genera for certain, Apatosaurus and Brontosaurus, and at least five species. Atlantosaurus and Amphicoelias might also belong to this group.

Below is a cladogram of apatosaurinae interrelationships based on Tschopp et al., 2015.

References

 
Diplodocids
Jurassic dinosaurs